34 Boötis is a single variable star in the northern constellation Boötes, located around 700 light years away from the Sun. At that distance, the visual magnitude of the star is diminished by an extinction of  due to interstellar dust. It has the variable star designation W Boötis; 34 Boötis is the Flamsteed designation. This object is visible to the naked eye as a faint, red-hued star with a baseline apparent visual magnitude of 4.80. It is moving away from the Earth with a heliocentric radial velocity of +5.6 km/s.

This is an aging red giant star with a stellar classification of M3− III, which indicates it has exhausted the supply of hydrogen at its core and evolved off the main sequence branch. It is classified as a semiregular variable with a brightness that varies from magnitude +4.49 down to +5.4 with a period of 25 days, with some evidence of longer term variation and mode switching. The star is around a billion years old with 2.2 times the mass of the Sun and has expanded to 129 times the size of the Sun. It is radiating 2,802 times the luminosity of the Sun from its enlarged photosphere at an effective temperature of 3,691 K.

Each has a margin of error of about 5%, but they differ from each other by far more than 5%.

References

M-type giants
Semiregular variable stars
Boötes
BD+27 2413
Bootis, 34
129712
071995
5490
Boötis, W